The Ultimate Tennis Showdown (UTS) is an international individual tennis league first played in 2020. The competition was organized by tennis coach Patrick Mouratoglou, and Alex Popyrin — entrepreneur and father of Alexei Popyrin, in response to the disruption of the tennis season due to the COVID-19 pandemic.

The events use a modified scoring format, with matches divided into timed quarters, and players allowed to play power up "cards" during matches to impact the game.

Ranking
The ranking at the end of UTS 1 is as follows:

UTS1 Finals

Format
UTS matches use a different format in comparison to traditional rules, including matches being divided into timed quarters rather than sets, a 15-second shot clock for serves and the ability to take a coaching timeout once per-set, and "cards" — which allow players to affect the game (such as taking away the opponent's second serve). The UTS also does not enforce a code of conduct.

See also 

 Tie Break Tens
 Glossary of tennis terms

References

External links
 Ultimate Tennis Showdown

Hard court tennis tournaments
Impact of the COVID-19 pandemic on sports
2020 in tennis
2020 in French tennis